Orkney and Shetland may refer to:

The Scottish island groups of Orkney and Shetland, collectively known as the Northern Isles
 Orkney and Shetland (UK Parliament constituency)
 The Orkney and Shetland Movement, a former electoral coalition